The Wrekin is a constituency in the House of Commons of the British Parliament, located in the county of Shropshire in the West Midlands of England. It has existed continuously since its creation by the Representation of the People Act 1918, and is named after a prominent landmark hill in the area, The Wrekin. The constituency has periodically swung back and forth between the Labour and Conservative parties since the 1920s, and has been held since 2005 by a Conservative MP, Mark Pritchard.

History
Political history
The seat saw a first winning candidate from the Labour Party relatively early in its history, in 1923. The seat alternated between the two largest modern parties eight times between 1923 and 1979.

In more recent history, reflecting the growing population of Telford and the rich iron smelting, railway and mining industries as major historic employers in the area, the seat was more Labour-leaning than the national average but still marginal, being represented by a Conservative for the first eight years of the Thatcher ministry and then (from 1987) returning a Labour member, who went on to serve a new seat created to serve Telford in 1997, and another Labour member until 2005, followed by the present Conservative who was elected that year.  The current Conservative majority is 18,726 votes.

Most prominent members in Parliament
Gerald Fowler (Labour) reached the frontbenches of government as the Minister for Education and Science from 1969 to 1970, again in 1974 and 1976 and as Minister for the Privy Council Office from 1974 to 1976.

Anthony Trafford (Conservative) went on after serving as MP to serve as a health minister, from the House of Lords in 1989.

Bruce Grocott (Labour) went on, after serving as MP for the newly created neighbouring seat from 1997 to 2001, to serve as the Government's Chief Whip in the House of Lords for six years.

Boundaries

1918–1950: The Borough of Wenlock, the Urban Districts of Dawley, Newport, Oakengates, and Wellington, and the Rural Districts of Newport, and Shifnal and Wellington.

1950–1983: The Urban Districts of Dawley, Newport, Oakengates, and Wellington, and the Rural Districts of Shifnal and Wellington.

1983–1997: The District of The Wrekin wards of Arleston, Brookside, College, Cuckoo Oak, Dawley Magna, Donnington, Donnington Wood, Dothill, Ercall, Hadley, Haygate, Hollinswood/Randlay, Ironbridge (The Gorge), Ketley, Ketley Bank, Langley, Lawley, Leegomery, Lilleshall, Madeley, Malinslee, Park, Priorslee, Stirchley, Wombridge, Woodside, Wrockwardine, and Wrockwardine Wood.

1997–2010: The District of The Wrekin wards of Arleston, Church Aston, College, Donnington, Donnington Wood, Dothill and Park, Edgmond, Ercall, Ercall Magna, Hadley, Haygate, Ketley, Leegomery, Lilleshall, Newport East, Newport North, Newport West, and Wrockwardine, and the District of Bridgnorth wards of Albrighton, Idsall, Manor, and Sheriffhales.

2010–present: The Borough of Telford and Wrekin wards of Apley Castle, Arleston, Church Aston and Lilleshall, College, Donnington, Dothill, Edgmond, Ercall, Ercall Magna, Hadley and Leegomery, Haygate, Muxton, Newport East, Newport North, Newport South, Newport West, Park, Shawbirch, and Wrockwardine, and the District of Bridgnorth wards of Albrighton South, Donington and Albrighton North, Shifnal Idsall, Shifnal Manor, and Shifnal Rural.

When originally constituted, the constituency, with a population of 71,352, was the largest division of Shropshire created in the 1918 boundary changes.

In the Third Periodical Review of the Boundary Commission, which took effect for the 1983 general election, the constituency was redefined after major local government changes.  This redefinition resulted in a quarter of the electorate being removed to Shropshire North and Ludlow.

Parliament approved major boundary changes which took effect at the 1997 general election, which created a new constituency containing and named after the town of Telford, before which Telford had been one of the largest elements of The Wrekin. The new Telford constituency took 62.9% of the electorate of The Wrekin leaving the remaining 37.1% to constitute a revised constituency of The Wrekin that incorporated areas previously within Shropshire North and Ludlow from two sides.

The area almost encircles Telford, a 'New Town', encompassing much of the rural parts of the Telford and Wrekin borough, in which most of the constituency is.  Its major settlements include: Wellington, Newport and Shifnal, as well as the suburban northern reaches of Telford (including Donnington). A small but significant area relates to the former Bridgnorth local government district (now part of the unitary Shropshire) and contains RAF Cosford and a number of commuter villages along the M54 motorway: the civil parishes of Sheriffhales, Shifnal, Tong, Boscobel, Albrighton, Donington and Boningale make up the non-Telford and The Wrekin-administered portion.  Boundary changes to realign the constituency boundaries to fit with the borough's most recent ward revisions resulted in the removal of Ketley (to the constituency of Telford) for the 2010 general election.

Future proposals: Under constituency boundary proposals announced in September 2016 this constituency was proposed to lose the Donnington and Hadley and Leegomery wards to Telford constituency, while the remainder would be merged into a new seat called Bridgnorth, Wellington and the Wrekin.

In June 2021 the boundary commission put forward a new name for the constituency of "Wellington and Newport" and that the wards of Hodnet and Cheswardine would be added from the North Shropshire constituency. The suggested name change has met with opposition locally.

Constituency profile
The constituency is in the east of Shropshire, specifically, around The Wrekin hill and therefore in undulating country within fast road access (and some rail access) commuter's reach to the West Midlands, Stafford and Stoke on Trent.

Workless claimants, registered jobseekers, were in November 2012 lower than the national average of 3.8%, at 3.1% of the population based on a statistical compilation by The Guardian.

Members of Parliament

Elections

Elections in the 2010s

Elections in the 2000s

Elections in the 1990s

Note: although The Wrekin was a Labour-held seat in the previous Parliament, boundary changes removed many Labour-leaning areas that now fall in the neighbouring seat of Telford, which Bruce Grocott decided to contest in 1997 instead of the new Wrekin seat. These changes made it notionally a Conservative seat, hence this is a gain rather than a hold.

Elections in the 1980s

Elections in the 1970s

Elections in the 1960s

Elections in the 1950s

Elections in the 1940s

Elections in the 1930s
General Election 1939/40:

Another General Election was required to take place before the end of 1940. The political parties had been making preparations for an election to take place from 1939 and by the end of this year, the following candidates had been selected; 
Conservative: James Baldwin-Webb
Labour: Ivor Owen Thomas

Elections in the 1920s

Elections in the 1910s

See also
 Parliamentary constituencies in Shropshire

Notes

References

Wrekin
Telford and Wrekin
Constituencies of the Parliament of the United Kingdom established in 1918